Alpha Island is an island of Bermuda, located in the Great Sound.
It may be better known as "Diving Board Island" as it is a popular spot for cliff jumping.

In popular culture 
In 2018, Snapchat allowed users to enable the new alpha version of its Android app, Snapchat Alpha, by clicking on an easter egg in Alpha Island.

References

Islands of Bermuda